Hochelaga is a French language Canadian crime drama written and directed by Michel Jetté. Produced in the year 2000, it stars Dominic Darceuil as a young would-be criminal and his deepening involvement with an outlaw motorcycle club during the Quebec Biker war.

Cast
Dominic Darceuil ... Marc
David Boutin ... Finger
Ronald Houle ... Massif
Jean-Nicolas Verreault ... Eric 'Nose' Beaupré
Michel Charette ... Bof
Deano Clavet ... Tatou
Claudia Hurtubise ... Coco
Patrick Peuvion ... Frais-Chié
Paul Dion ... Popeye
Michèle Péloquin ... Mère de Marc
André Lacoste ... Stash
Michael D'Amico ... Motton
Catherine Trudeau ... Louise

Awards
David Boutin won the Jutra Award for Best Supporting Actor at the 3rd Jutra Awards in 2001. The film was also nominated for Best Film, Best Director (Jetté), Best Screenplay (Jetté), Best Sound (Dominique Delguste), Best Editing (Jetté, Louise Sabourin) and Best Original Music (Gilles Grégoire).

References

External links

2000 films
Films directed by Michel Jetté
2000s French-language films
Canadian crime drama films
2000 crime drama films
Films shot in Montreal
Films set in Montreal
French-language Canadian films
2000s Canadian films